Abies concolor, the white fir, is a coniferous tree in the pine family Pinaceae. This tree is native to the mountains of western North America, including the Cascade Range and southern Rocky Mountains, and into the isolated mountain ranges of southern Arizona, New Mexico, and Northern Mexico.

It is popular as an ornamental landscaping tree and as a Christmas tree.

Description 
The dead tree tops sometimes fork into new growth.

The leaf arrangement is spiral on the shoot, but with each leaf variably twisted at the base so they all lie in either two more-or-less flat ranks on either side of the shoot, or upswept across the top of the shoot but not below the shoot.

The winged seeds are released when the cones disintegrate at maturity about 6 months after pollination.

White fir can live over 300 years.

Subspecies 
As treated here, there are two subspecies; these are also variously treated at either the lower rank of variety by some authors, or as distinct species by others:

Botanical collection 
White fir was first collected by Augustus Fendler on his expedition to the Santa Fe area of New Mexico in 1846–1847. Fender's patron George Engelmann, a St. Louis area physician and botanist, then described the plant. This tree was first collected in California by William Lobb on his expedition to California of 1849–1853, after it was overlooked by David Douglas in his 1825–27 expedition to the Pacific coast region.

The specific epithet concolor means "all one color".

Distribution 
This tree is native to the mountains of western North America from the southern Cascade Range in Oregon, south throughout California and into the Sierra de San Pedro Mártir in northern Baja California, and south throughout the Colorado Plateau and southern Rocky Mountains in Utah and Colorado, and into the isolated mountain ranges of southern Arizona, New Mexico, and Northern Mexico.

Ecology 
White fir is very closely related to grand fir (Abies grandis), with subspecies lowiana being particularly similar to the interior variety of grand fir, A. grandis var. idahoensis, intergrading with it where they meet in the Cascades of Central Oregon. White fir occupies a broader range, including dryer and colder sites, being more drought tolerant and having thicker, fire-resistant bark. In Mexico, it is replaced by further close relatives, Durango fir (A. durangensis) and Mexican fir (A. mexicana).

Like grand fir, white fir is more shade tolerant than Douglas fir, but less so than western hemlock and western redcedar. White fir is a climax species, which means the forest has reached complex maturity in forest succession in western coniferous forests of the U.S. White fir and yellow pine (ponderosa pine/Jeffrey pine) have co-existed for millennia in old growth forests throughout their range. In the presence of logging of large diameter trees and exclusion of cleansing wildfires, young trees have become abundant over the past two centuries. White fir had been regarded as a pest in the past by those in the lumber industry, but this opinion has changed. White fir is now one of the most important of all commercial softwoods according to the Western Wood Products Association.

The white fir trait of retaining lower limbs creates an escape route for medium-to-small forest birds (such as spotted owl) from larger flying predators and provides a drip zone around the roots for collecting moisture. The retained limbs can become a fuel ladder that allows flames to climb up to the canopy. Limbing-up white fir, instead of removing medium to large diameter trees, in areas where the public is more likely to start fires can help keep other trees and specifically giant sequoia from experiencing canopy fire. Recent concern for sequoia groves has caused agencies to call for removal of white fir in the Sierra Nevada. While sequoia seedlings and young saplings are highly susceptible to mortality or serious injury by fire; mature sequoias are fire adapted with: fire-resistant bark, elevated canopies, self-pruning lower branches, latent buds, and serotinous cones. The sequoia ecosystem is incomplete without the mixed pine/fir and oak that make up the mid and understory. Giant Sequoia's cones release seeds when the heat of fire triggers them to open while the thick bark protects the inner cambium from fire damage.

This tree is host to fir mistletoe (Phoradendron pauciflorum), a parasitic plant. It is attacked by many types of insects, such as the fir engraver (Scolytus ventralis).

Dependent species 
Mature white fir–yellow pine forests support old-growth dependent wildlife species such as California spotted owl (Strix occidentalis occidentalis), Mount Pinos sooty grouse (Dendragapus fuliginosus howardi), and Pacific fisher (Pekania pennanti). The spotted owl and fisher utilize cavities in decadent large-diameter white fir for nesting and denning. The Mount Pinos sooty grouse requires large diameter trees for thermal cover and its winter diet consists of mostly white fir and yellow pine needles. This subspecies of sooty grouse has been extirpated along with a significant number of large diameter white fir from much of its range. Other subspecies of sooty grouse also utilize Douglas fir, which does not occur in the range of Mount Pinos sooty grouse. Squirrel also frequent the tree's branches.

Deer browse the foliage of this species and porcupines chew the bark. Songbirds, grouse, and various mammals eat the seeds.

Uses 
White fir and grand fir were used by Native Americans for medicinal use involving powdered bark or pitch to treat tuberculosis or skin ailments. The Nlaka'pamux used the bark to cover lodges and make canoes. Branches were also used as bedding.

White fir is a preferred construction species because of its nail-holding ability, lightness in weight, and resistance to split, twist, and pitch. It is straight-grained, non-resinous, fine-textured, stiff, and strong.

It is popular as a Christmas tree and for Christmas decoration owing to its soft needles, generally excellent needle retention and abundance. It is often marketed as concolor or white fir.

Cultivation
White fir is widely planted as an ornamental tree in parks and larger gardens, particularly some cultivars of subsp. concolor selected for very bright glaucous blue foliage, such as cv. 'Violacea'.

Gallery

References

Further reading

External links 
 
 Jepson eFlora Treatment - Abies concolor
 Gymnosperm Database: Abies concolor — (treated as varieties of one species).
 Interactive Distribution Map of Abies concolor
 USDA Plants Profile for Abies concolor (white fir)
 Conifers Around the World: Abies concolor - Rocky Mountain White Fir.
 Conifer Database

concolor
Trees of the Western United States
Trees of the Southwestern United States
Trees of the Great Basin
Trees of Northwestern Mexico
Trees of the Northwestern United States
Trees of the South-Central United States
Trees of Sonora
Trees of Baja California
Flora of the Cascade Range
Flora of the Klamath Mountains
Flora of the Rocky Mountains
Flora of the Sierra Nevada (United States)
Flora of California
Natural history of the California Coast Ranges
Natural history of the Peninsular Ranges
Least concern plants
Garden plants of North America
Ornamental trees
Flora of the Sierra Madre Occidental